Lightning Rod is a steel roller coaster located at Dollywood theme park in Pigeon Forge, Tennessee. Manufactured by Rocky Mountain Construction (RMC), the ride is themed to hot rod cars from the 1950s and opened to the public on June 13, 2016. Initially marketed as the first launched wooden roller coaster of its kind, Lightning Rod was later modified for the 2021 season, with over half of its wooden Topper Track getting replaced with RMC's steel I-Box track.

Dollywood originally planned for the ride to open at the beginning of the 2016 season, but it was delayed due to a problem with the magnetic launch system. Lightning Rod operated in limited capacity for much of its inaugural season and has been plagued with issues over the years that led to frequent closures.

History

Construction
Planning for a new roller coaster at Dollywood park (in Pigeon Forge, Tennessee) began in 2014; park officials selected a hilly, wooded site for the construction of a new roller coaster. This rugged section of terrain was to be a key factor in the coaster’s unique layout and ride experience. Dolly Parton herself publicly announced the plans for the roller coaster during a press conference on August 7, 2015. Upon Mrs. Parton’s announcement and confirmation, this ride (estimated to cost $22 million) was slated to be the largest investment, on any one attraction, in Dollywood's history. The project was just one part of a multi-year, $300-million park expansion, which was initiated in 2013. The park hired Rocky Mountain Construction (RMC) to design and manufacture the new coaster.

Construction of Lightning Rod commenced in May of 2015, when workers began laying footers for the ride. Plans focused on revitalizing the Jukebox Junction area of the park (open since 1995), with Lightning Rod as its primary attraction. The area would maintain its 1950s theming, with the entire section showcasing a design aesthetic unique to that era within the Sevierville and East Tennessee region. The project included interior renovations and an outdoor seating area at Red's Diner; a hot rod-themed retail store called Hi Octane; a chicken sandwich truck; and an airstream trailer selling Dippin' Dots ice cream. 

Ahead of Lightning Rod's opening, Mayfield Dairy released a co-branded ice cream flavor called "Smoky Mountain Fudge", advertising the coaster. On February 3, 2016, Dollywood invited press members to preview Lightning Rod. Lightning Rod was scheduled to open with the park on March 15, 2016, but the opening was postponed. On March 24, 2016, Fred Grubb (of RMC) said that the roller coaster's magnetic launch system (developed by Pennsylvania-based Velocity Magnetics) would not be able to “perform at the level required” for proper operation. Mr. Grubb did not elaborate any further on the nature of the problem, nor did he offer an estimate or a timeline for the delay.

Operation
Lightning Rod opened occasionally for "technical rehearsals", where select guests could experience the ride. It officially opened to the public on June 13, 2016. After several days of operation, Dollywood closed Lightning Rod on June 18, 2016. The closure was necessitated because RMC had recalled a part used in several of its rides, including Lighting Rod. The ride reopened in limited capacity on June 22, 2016. Park officials later clarified that the ride was operating in "technical rehearsal" status, meaning it would close periodically for maintenance. On September 5, 2016, Dollywood announced that the ride was again fully operational. 

By 2017, the ride had gained a reputation for unreliability, although local news station WBIR-TV disputed this, saying: "It is not true that the ride is down more often than not." Lightning Rod closed in early July 2018 and did not reopen until October 10, 2018. The park did not specify the reason for the closure, but Director of Public Relations Pete Owens stated it was not related to the launch. After it reopened, guests noticed changes to the lead car of each train as well as new wood along portions of the ride's structure.

In late September 2020, Lightning Rod closed again, this time for the remainder of the season. Rocky Mountain Construction began work to make major unspecified modifications to the attraction. Park officials subsequently confirmed that a portion of Lightning Rod's wooden Topper Track was being replaced with steel I-Box Track, making the coaster a hybrid of wood and steel. The trains had put too much stress on the wooden track in several sections, including the launch. It reopened with the rest of the park in March 2021. RCDB updated the roller coaster's classification from wood to steel, reporting that 57 percent of the track had been converted.

Ride experience

Queue
Guests enter Johnny Rev's garage, where the queue takes place. In the first area, guests pass by several tires, trophies, equipment and a full-scale model of a hot rod. Heading outside, there is a sign with the phone number on Randy's Repair Shop, resembling the Dollywood hours and information phone line. After winding through the outdoor area, guests enter a three story research building, which contains a lot of the behind the scenes top secret information. The next area resembles a custom hot rod shop. There are two green doors that show a welding room. This room also features a chalkboard, blueprints and more tools. After climbing the stairs, guests reach another area. Here, Rev's private tinkering and hot rod design space can be seen. The Lightning Rod mural is also spotted. Then, guests reach the last area, which is the loading station. There are numerous boxes and crates that are casually tucked into various nooks and crannies in this area. Guests select a row and board the train.

Layout
The train drops a short length into a dip that leads into the tallest hill of the ride. A climb to the left follows, and the train enters the first of several steeply-banked turns. It then rises to the right, snaps to the left, and then back to the right once more. This is followed by a right-hand turn, another snap-left-then-right sequence, and a double-up climb. The train then descends through a sequence of four consecutive drops and a sharp bank to the right as it passes near the station. The finale is a final uphill, 180-degree turn to the right that finishes with a short drop into the final brake run.

Characteristics 
Upon opening, Lightning Rod became the first wooden roller coaster in the world to use a launch system instead of a traditional chain lift hill. The linear synchronous motors are powered by a large bank of capacitors that are located in the main building. This system would require 1,500 horsepower (1.1 megawatts) to catapult each train.

The ride originally used RMC's Topper Track technology, which consists of continuously welded metal plates that cover the wooden track. According to Pete Owens, Lightning Rod was constructed in the same way as the park's other wooden coaster, Thunderhead, except that Lightning Rod also "has a continuously welded tubular steel track for a better ride". The use of Topper Track also allowed the ride to contain overbanked turns, which could not be used on many traditional wooden coasters due to structural limitations. Much of the Topper Track was replaced with I-Box track prior to the 2021 season.

Lightning Rod's trains are themed to hot rod cars from the 1950s. According to the Los Angeles Times, the theming on each train includes an "injector scoop, header pipes and a flame paint job". Each train has six cars, with each car seating four people (two rows of two riders), for a total capacity of 24 riders per train. The wheels on Lightning Rod's trains are made of urethane instead of steel. This was intended to allow a quieter and smoother ride experience.

Awards
Lightning Rod received the Golden Ticket Award for Best New Ride in 2016. The website coaster101.com gave the ride its "Coaster of the Decade Award" in 2019. In addition, every year from 2016 to 2019, Amusement Today magazine's Golden Ticket Awards ranked Lightning Rod among the world's top 50 wooden coasters. Amusement Today began classifying Lightning Rod as a steel coaster in 2021, when the ride was ranked among the world's top 50 steel coasters.

References

External links

 
 
 Lightning Rod at Rocky Mountain Construction

Roller coasters in Tennessee
Best New Ride winners